Dartz Motorz Company  is a privately held Latvia-based company, subsidiary of Estonian corporation Dartz Grupa OÜ, that designs, manufactures, and sells high performance armored vehicles. The company constituted itself from a renovated former Russo-Balt factory in Riga, Latvia.

Product lineup
In 2009, Dartz attained notoriety with its Prombron model, in part because it was originally available in upholstered leather made from the foreskins of whale penises, which the company subsequently dropped after the controversy was publicized.

The Prombron came in nine distinct models: Iron Diamond, Iron Xtal, Monaco Red Diamond Edition, Black Dragon, Black Russian, Gold Russian, Aladeen, White Horse, and Monako.

Since September 2014, the product line consists of Prombron Black Shark and Black Snake. The Prombron is available in either the Saloon (sedan) or the Pullman (wagon), offered in standard, short, or long wheelbase.

In 2010, Red Sea Distribution announced that the T-98 Kombat would be available in North America for a list price starting at $225,000. However, just two years later the T-98 Kombat was phased out, and the Prombron was released.

Dartz's Prombron Monaco Red Diamond Edition was shown at the 2010 Top Marques in Monaco, with an expected price of €1,000,000 ($1.25 million), it would become the world's most expensive SUV. The features included white gold-ruby encrusted embedded badges as well as gold-plated, bullet-proof windows, an exhaust system made out of tungsten, diamond-ruby encrusted gauges, and Kevlar exterior coating. It also comes with three bottles of the world's most expensive vodka, RussoBaltique.

The website explains things about their vehicles like what animal skin the interior couches are made of, or how it smells, but no actual information along the lines of armor rating or vehicle performance.

See also
 Kombat Armouring continues production of the T-98 Kombat

References 

17. https://www.krone.at/2665033
SYMBOL FÜR PUTIN-KRIEG
Militärautobauer Dartz entfernt Z aus dem Logo
Sie bauen Autos wie Panzer, wie ehrfurchteinflößendes Kriegsgerät. Dartz Motorz heißt die Marke. Stationiert in Lettland, könnte man sagen. Auch wenn viele von „Russenbombern“ sprechen. Und sie tragen ein Z in ihrem Markenlogo. Bzw. trugen, denn das Z haben sie jetzt entfernt. Aus pazifistischen Gründen. Denn Z steht mittlerweile für den russischen Angriffskrieg auf die Ukraine.

External links

Parent company website
Official website

Truck manufacturers of Latvia
Manufacturing companies based in Riga
Estonian brands
Latvian brands